Andrews United Methodist Church is a historic Methodist church at 95 Richmond Street in Cypress Hills, Brooklyn, New York, United States.  It is now Andrews Ghana Wesley United Methodist Church.  It was built in 1893 and is a one-story, asymmetrical orange brick church in the Queen Anne style. It features a massive rose window on the front facade and a three-story, square bell tower.  The interior is arranged on the Akron Plan.  Attached to the church is a two-story Sunday school wing. Also on the property is the original church parsonage  It is a two-story frame dwelling built in 1878–1879 in the Italianate style.

It was listed on the National Register of Historic Places in 1992.

References

Cypress Hills, Brooklyn
United Methodist churches in New York City
Churches in Brooklyn
Properties of religious function on the National Register of Historic Places in Brooklyn
Queen Anne architecture in New York (state)
Churches completed in 1893
19th-century Methodist church buildings in the United States
Akron Plan church buildings